Superintendent/Commander George Gideon of Scotland Yard is a fictional policeman who appeared in 26 police procedural novels, 21 of which were written by John Creasey under the pseudonym J.J. Marric, and published between 1955 and 1976. 
Portraying Gideon as a master balancing the management of cases and the workings of law enforcement, it has been considered his "most famous police procedural series".
After Creasey's death, the series was continued in five further novels by William Vivian Butler.

Anthony Boucher of the New York Times Book Review considered the first of the books, Gideon's Day (1955), to be author's best book.  H. R. F. Keating, reviewer for the London Times picked Gideon's Week (1956) as one of the "100 Best Crime and Mystery Books" (1845-1986). Gideon's Fire (1962) won the Edgar Award from the Mystery Writers of America.

The character 
George Gideon ("G.G." or "Gee-Gee" to coppers and crooks alike) is powerfully built but has a gentle voice. He has pale-blue eyes.  He is famed for his prodigious feats of memory and his ability to handle a bewildering work-load of cases simultaneously. Despite his seniority in rank, Gideon often takes a hands-on approach and on occasions physically engages with criminals.  He is respected and liked by his staff - but they know to keep their heads down  when his temper is aroused. In the first novel, Gideon's Day he holds the rank of Detective Superintendent, but in the second Gideon's Week, he has been promoted to Commander, and is the operational head of the Yard's entire CID, a position he holds for the rest of the series.

One of Creasey's technical advisers for the series was Commander George Hatherill, who had organized the British Army's Special Investigation Branch during World War II, and was the operational head of the Yard's CID from 1954 until 1964 (the same position Gideon held in fiction) during which time he was awarded the OBE.  Hatherill is generally believed to have been Creasey's model for Gideon.

Family 
Throughout the series, Marric emphasizes the pressure experienced by police families due to the demands of police work, and the impact of distress in the family on the ability to work.
Gideon is married to Kate, and has six surviving children. Their relationship has been strained by the loss of a seventh child while Gideon was on the Flying Squad (prior to the start of the series). In Gideon's Day , the first book in the series, the children are described as Tom (age 26); Prudence (18+), Priscilla (15+), Matthew (14), Penelope (12), and Malcolm (8).  The oldest children are self-supporting; the younger ones in school. As the series progresses, the children train for careers, move out, and marry. Family relationships are usually mentioned only briefly, to establish a time frame or as they relate to or affect Gideon's work.

Penny, the Gideons' youngest daughter, is mentioned most frequently, in part because of her on-and-off relationship with an older police officer, Alec Hobbs. In Gideon's Wrath (1967) Alec Hobbs' first wife Helen dies, around the time that Hobbs becomes Gideon's deputy. In Gideon's River (1968) Hobbs escorts Penelope to the river gala, accompanying Gideon and Kate. In Gideon's Way, written by William Vivian Butler and published in 1983, Alec and Penny are married and have a son, George.

The number of children was trimmed in the TV series.

Film and TV 
In Gideon's Day (1958, directed by John Ford, USA title: Gideon Of Scotland Yard), Gideon is played by Jack Hawkins. The co-stars were 
Anna Lee (Kate Gideon), 
Dianne Foster (Joanna Delafield), 
Ronald Howard (Paul Delafield), 
Cyril Cusack (Birdy Sparrow), and 
Andrew Ray (PC Simon Farnaby-Green). The film was released by Columbia Pictures and is only loosely based on the book of the same title.  Ford treats it as a comedy-melodrama, whereas the book is a more serious and straightforward procedural.
 
A 26-part TV series Gideon's Way (USA title: Gideon C.I.D.) was made in 1964, starring John Gregson, which ran until 1966 in the UK, produced by ITC Entertainment.

Bibliography
 Gideon's Day (1955) 
 Gideon's Week (1956)
 Gideon's Night (1957) 
 Gideon's Month (1958) 
 Gideon's Staff (1959)

 Gideon's Risk (1960) 
 Gideon's Fire (1961) 
 Gideon's March (1962) 
 Gideon's Ride (1963) 
 Gideon's Vote (1964) 
 Gideon's Lot (1965) 
 Gideon's Badge (1966) 
 Gideon's Wrath (1967) 
 Gideon's River (1968) 
 Gideon's Power (1969) 
 Gideon's Sport (1970) 
 Gideon's Art (1971) 
 Gideon's Men (1972) 
 Gideon's Press (1973) 
 Gideon's Fog (1975) 
 Gideon's Drive (1976)
 Gideon and the Young Toughs and Other Stories (2022, collection of short stories originally published between 1961 and 1975).

Gideon at Work (1957) Three Volumes in one, Gideon's Day, Gideon's Week, Gideon's Night

The series was continued after Creasey's death by William Vivian Butler:

 Gideon's Force (1978)
 Gideon's Law (1981)
 Gideon's Way (1983)
 Gideon's Raid (1986)
 Gideon's Fear (1990)

Gideon's staff and family

References

External links 

John Creasey presentation by copyright owner Owatonna Media
Nico van Embden: William Vivian Butler bibliography
Shots Magazine: J.J. Marric (John Creasey) Close Up Retrieved 2012-06-13
 

Fictional British police detectives
Crime novel series
John Creasey characters
Fictional English people
Literary characters introduced in 1955
Characters in British novels of the 20th century